Events in the year 2021 in Suriname.

Incumbents
 President: Chan Santokhi 
 Vice President: Ronnie Brunswijk 
 Speaker: Marinus Bee

Events
Ongoing — COVID-19 pandemic in Suriname

Deaths

3 February – Asraf Peerkhan, 74, football executive.
21 March – Shahied Wagid Hosain, singer (born c.1961).

References

 
2020s in Suriname
Years of the 21st century in Suriname
Suriname
Suriname